Hipolit Terlecki (1806–1890) was a Polish theologian.

1806 births
1890 deaths
Polish theologians